This article lists fellows of the Royal Society who were elected in 2015.

Fellows of the Royal Society (FRS)

 Mark Achtman
 Ali Alavi 
 Allan Balmain 
 Kamal Bawa 
 Stephen D. M. Brown FMedSci 
 Jane Clarke FMedSci 
 Clifford Cocks CB 
 Sir Rory Collins FMedSci 
 Andrew Ian Cooper 
 Stephen A. Cusack 
 Anne Cutler 
 Benjamin Guy Davis
 Annette Dolphin FMedSci
 Philip Donoghue 
 Daniel J. Drucker 
 Sir James Dyson CBE FREng 
 Anthony William Fairbank Edwards
 Yvonne Elsworth 
 Alison Etheridge 
 Jeremy Farrar OBE FMedSci 
 Zoubin Ghahramani 
 Michael E. Goddard
 Michael Hausser FMedSci 
 Laurence Hurst
 Jane A. Langdale 
 Andrew P. Mackenzie
 Philip Maini
 Jens Marklof
 Gero Miesenböck FMedSci 
 Ketan J. Patel FMedSci 
 David Phillips CBE
 Jonathan Pila
 Roger Powell
 John Rarity
 Andrew Fraser Read
 Alan Madoc Roberts
 John Robertson
 Roger Sheldon
 Dame Julia Slingo DBE
 Scott William Sloan
 Henry Snaith
 Ajay K. Sood
 Natalie Strynadka
 Richard Thomas
 Bryan M. Turner FMedSci
 Frank Uhlmann
 Colin Wilson 
 Lisa Jardine Honorary Fellow
 Sir Robin Saxby Honorary Fellow

Foreign Members of the Royal Society (ForMemRS)
 Alain Aspect
 Zdeněk Bažant 
 Linda B. Buck
 Andrew H. Knoll
 John Kuriyan
 Jiayang Li
 Susan Lindquist 
 Gail R. Martin
 William Hughes Miller
 John C. H. Spence

References
    

2015
2015 in the United Kingdom
2015 in science